Anuradha Lohia  ( Fatehpuria)   is an Indian molecular parasitologist who works in infectious disease. She is currently the Vice Chancellor of the Presidency University. She was earlier the Chairperson of the Department of Biochemistry in the Bose Institute in Kolkata. She was Chairperson of an Indo-British Wellcome Trust/ DBT India Alliance, an organization to promote medical research in India.

Education and career
She was a student of the Modern High School for Girls in Calcutta. She did a B.Sc. in Physiology from Presidency College in Calcutta University and an M.Sc. in Physiology from Rajabazar Science College, Calcutta University and later did her doctorate in Vibrio cholerae from the Indian Institute of Chemical Biology. She was a visiting scientist in various universities around the world. She did her postdoctoral research in New York University Medical Centre. She was elected a fellow of the Indian Academy of Sciences. She was also awarded the Stree Shakti award and the UNESCO Molecular and Cell Biology network grant.

References

Year of birth missing (living people)
Living people
Indian parasitologists
Indian women biologists
20th-century Indian biologists
University of Calcutta alumni
Place of birth missing (living people)
Women parasitologists
Fellows of the Indian Academy of Sciences
20th-century Indian women
Women scientists from West Bengal